The second Peel ministry was formed by Sir Robert Peel in the United Kingdom of Great Britain and Ireland in 1841.

History

Peel came to power for a second time after the Conservative victory in the General Election caused the Whig government of Lord Melbourne to resign.

Henry Goulburn was Chancellor of the Exchequer, the future Prime Minister Lord Aberdeen Foreign Secretary and Sir James Graham Home Secretary. William Gladstone, who was yet to join the Liberal Party, became a member of the cabinet for the first time in 1843 when he was appointed President of the Board of Trade.  His future rival Benjamin Disraeli was overlooked by Peel and was a sharp critic of the government.

The government was brought down by Peel's decision in 1846 to support the repeal of the Corn Laws, leading to a split in the Tory party and the formation of a Whig government under Lord John Russell.

Cabinet

September 1841 – July 1846

Changes
 October 1841: Lord FitzGerald succeeds Lord Ellenborough as President of the Board of Control.
 February 1842: The Duke of Buccleuch succeeds the Duke of Buckingham as Lord Privy Seal.
 May 1843: Lord Ripon succeeds FitzGerald as President of the Board of Control. William Gladstone succeeds Ripon at the Board of Trade.
 May 1844: Lord Granville Somerset, Chancellor of the Duchy of Lancaster, enters the Cabinet. Sir Henry Hardinge leaves the cabinet. His successor as Secretary at War is not in the Cabinet.
 February 1845: William Gladstone resigns as President of the Board of Trade.  His successor in that post is not in the Cabinet. The First Commissioner of Woods and Forests, Lord Lincoln, enters the Cabinet, while Sir Edward Knatchbull, the Paymaster, leaves it.
 May 1845: Sidney Herbert, the Secretary at War, enters the Cabinet.
 December 1845: Gladstone succeeds Lord Stanley as Secretary for War and the Colonies.
 January 1846: The Duke of Buccleuch succeeds Lord Wharnecliffe as Lord President. Lord Haddington succeeds Buccleuch as Lord Privy Seal. Ellenborough succeeds Haddington as First Lord of the Admiralty. Lincoln becomes Chief Secretary for Ireland. His successor as First Commissioner of Woods and Forests is not in the Cabinet.

List of ministers
Members of the Cabinet are indicated by bold face.

Notes

References
C. Cook and B. Keith, ''British Historical Facts 1830–1900'’

British ministries
Government
1840s in the United Kingdom
1841 establishments in the United Kingdom
1846 disestablishments in the United Kingdom
Ministry 2
Ministries of Queen Victoria
Cabinets established in 1841
Cabinets disestablished in 1846